(born 1 August 1985 in the former Urawa, Saitama) is a Japanese actress and model. She graduated from Kyoritsu Women's University in 2008.

Filmography

Film
 Happy Flight (2008)
 Kōfuku no Alibi (2016)
 Tenjō no Hana (2022), Keiko Hagiwara

Television
 My Boss My Hero (2006)
 The Pride of the Temp (2007)
 Kaibutsu-kun (2010, ep.5)
 Kimi wa Pet (2017)
 Tramps Like Us (2017)
 My Little Monster (2018)

References

External links
 Official profile 

Japanese actresses
1985 births
Living people
People from Saitama (city)